Barleux is a commune in the Somme department in Hauts-de-France in northern France.

Geography
Situated  from the A1 autoroute, at the junction of the D79 and D148 roads, about halfway between Amiens and Saint-Quentin.

Population

See also
Communes of the Somme department

References

Communes of Somme (department)